'When I Fall in Love is an album by Sacha Distel, released by Mercury Records in 2003 and features collaborations with Dionne Warwick and Liza Minnelli.

Track listing
It Had To Be You (2:53)
The Good Life(feat. Dionne Warwick) (4:13)
I Only Have Eyes For You (2:55)
All The Way (feat. Liza Minnelli) (2:53)
My Funny Valentine (3:27)
When I Fall In Love (feat. Dionne Warwick) (3:45)
Mona Lisa (3:12)
What A Wonderful World (3:23)
But Beautiful (4:29)
Spell "Charme" (3:02)
Girl Talk (3:14)
Young And Foolish (3:26)
It's In The Eyes (Ecoutes Mes Yeux) (4:02)
L.O.V.E (2:48)
I Fall in Love Too Easily (2:20)
If We Could Stop Time (Si L'on Pouvait Arreter Le Temps) (feat. Dionne Warwick) (3:44)
Raindrops Keep Falling On My Head (2:53)

External links

 http://www.sachadistel.com/When-I-Fall-In-Love

2003 albums